Ryan Coetzee (born 12 August 1995) is a South African swimmer. He competed in the men's 100 metre butterfly at the 2019 World Aquatics Championships. In 2018, Coetzee won bronze medals in the  Men's 50m Butterfly and 4x100 medley relay  at the Commonwealth Games.

References

External links

1995 births
People from Phalaborwa
Living people
African Games gold medalists for South Africa
African Games medalists in swimming
Commonwealth Games bronze medallists for South Africa
Commonwealth Games medallists in swimming
Swimmers at the 2019 African Games
South African male swimmers
Swimmers at the 2018 Commonwealth Games
Male butterfly swimmers
Sportspeople from Limpopo
Competitors at the 2017 Summer Universiade
Tennessee Volunteers men's swimmers
20th-century South African people
21st-century South African people
Medallists at the 2018 Commonwealth Games